Gran Alianza Nacional can refer to:

 Grand National Alliance (Dominican Republic)
 Grand National Alliance (Guatemala)